2021 South American Championships in Athletics was the 52nd edition of the biennial athletics competition between South American nations. The event was held in Guayaquil, Ecuador, from 29 to 31 May at the Estadio Modelo Alberto Spencer Herrera. It should be organised by Buenos Aires but the venue was cancelled due to Covid-19 pandemic.

Medal summary

Men

Women

Mixed

Medal table

Points table
''After 2 days of competition

Participation
All 13 member federations of CONSUDATLE participated at the championships. Dominican Republic and Puerto Rico participated as guests.

References

External links

Full results

South American Championships in Athletics
International athletics competitions hosted by Ecuador
Sport in Guayaquil
South American Championships in Athletics
Athletics Championships
South American Championships in Athletics